Zurab Malkhazovich Arziani (born 19 October 1987) is a Georgian footballer. He also holds Russian citizenship.

Career
On 21 January 2015, Arziani and FC Sakhalin Yuzhno-Sakhalinsk cancelled their contract by mutual consent.

Personal life
He is the son of Malkhaz Arziani.

Career statistics

Honors
Anzhi Makhachkala
Russian First Division (1): 2009
Dila Gori
Georgian Cup (1): 2011–12

References

External links

1987 births
Sportspeople from Batumi
Living people
Russian footballers
Russian expatriate footballers
Association football midfielders
Russian sportspeople of Georgian descent
FC Anzhi Makhachkala players
FC Volga Nizhny Novgorod players
FC Dila Gori players
Nyíregyháza Spartacus FC players
FC Dinamo Tbilisi players
FC Saturn Ramenskoye players
FC Rubin Kazan players
FC Orenburg players
FC Sakhalin Yuzhno-Sakhalinsk players
FC Armavir players
FC Shukura Kobuleti players
FC Saburtalo Tbilisi players
FC Dinamo Batumi players
FC Kolkheti-1913 Poti players
FC Merani Tbilisi players
FC Ararat Yerevan players
FC Shevardeni-1906 Tbilisi players
Russian Premier League players
Erovnuli Liga players
Nemzeti Bajnokság I players
Armenian Premier League players
Erovnuli Liga 2 players
Russian expatriate sportspeople in Georgia (country)
Expatriate footballers in Georgia (country)
Russian expatriate sportspeople in Hungary
Expatriate footballers in Hungary
Russian expatriate sportspeople in Armenia
Expatriate footballers in Armenia